Kavitha may refer to:
 Kavitha (1962 film), an Indian Tamil language film
 Kavitha (1973 film), an Indian Malayalam film
 Kavitha (actress) (born 1965), South Indian actress
 Kavitha Anandasivam (born 2002), Sri Lankan-Australian actress
 Kody Kavitha (born 1991), Indian-American actress
 Kavitha Lankesh, filmmaker and director in Kannada language
 Kavita Krishnamurthy, Indian playback singer
 Kavitha (village), a village in Borsad, Anand district, Gujarat, India